The Futurist Political Party was an Italian political party founded in 1918 by Filippo Tommaso Marinetti as an extension of the futurist artistic and social movement. The party had a radical program which included promoting gender parity and abolishing marriage, inheritance, military service and secret police. The party was absorbed into the Fasci Italiani di Combattimento in 1919.

Ideology

Futurist Democracy 
 The abolition of marriage, with children raised by the state with funds raised by a tax on free love.
 Bureaucratic decentralization and abolition of seniority in state careers.
 "Technical government without Senate", i.e. a youth council made up of a dozen people under 30 years, elected by universal suffrage direct.
 Land reform similar to that of Henry George.
 Gender equality in employment and participation in political life.
 Creation of "schools of courage and patriotism", which eventually became the Opera Nazionale Balilla.
 Prison reform and abolition of the political police.

References

External links 
 "Political Manifesto of Futurism" (in Italian).

1918 establishments in Italy
Defunct political parties in Italy
Italian Futurism
Political parties established in 1918
Georgist parties
Defunct nationalist parties in Italy
National syndicalism
Syncretic political movements